Be'sat Metro Station is a station of Tehran Metro Line 6, and currently the line's only intermediate station. It is located at the junction of 17th of Shahrivar Avenue into Be'sat Expressway, with the station's main entrance on the southern sidewalk of Be'sat Expressway.

References 

Tehran Metro stations